Peter Green or Greene (March 13, 1868 – September 22, 1934) was a Canadian professional ice hockey coach and trainer with the Ottawa Hockey Club/Ottawa Senators. Green won ten Stanley Cup titles in his time with Ottawa, four as a trainer, and six as a coach. Green also was a trainer with the Ottawa Football Club and in lacrosse.

Career
Peter Green began his athletic career with the Ottawa Capitals field lacrosse team as a player in 1890. He would later become their trainer and coach. He coached the Ottawa Rough Riders football team from 1900 to 1903, during which they won two Canadian championships.

In 1905, Green was hired by the Ottawa Hockey Club or "Silver Seven" as a trainer. In 1908, he was promoted to head coach to replace Alf Smith, who left to join the Kenora Thistles. Under his tenure, Ottawa won the Stanley Cup three times. The 1908–09 team went 10–2 to win the Eastern Canada Hockey Association (ECHA_ title and the Cup for the first time in three years as champion of the Eastern Canada Hockey Association. The team won two challenges during the 1909-10 season, to earn the Stanley Cup title again, only to lose the Cup to the Montreal Wanderers who won the regular season title. The team won the 1910-11 regular season title to regain the Stanley Cup. They then successfully defended it in two Stanley Cup challenges. The team went 9–9 in the following 1911–12 season and lost the chance to tie for the league title with the Quebec Bulldogs after losing a replayed game to end the year. They went 9-11 in the 1912–13 season, tied for third with two other teams. Green left Ottawa after the season, having gone 50-28 in five seasons.

In 1919, he was re-hired to coach the Ottawa Senators, now of the National Hockey League (NHL).  Green won three more Stanley Cups as a coach in 1920, 1921, and 1922. He is one of eleven coaches to have won the Stanley Cup three times with an NHL club, and he did so on the strength of six playoff appearances, the least among the eleven to have won three. Owing to his short tenure, he has the least games managed among the eleven, but his winning percentage is second best among the eleven, although Green is the only one to not be inducted into the Hockey Hall of Fame. 

Green was a long-time employee of the Canadian Post Office before retiring in 1933. He died at an Ottawa hospital aged 66 after a short illness (heart condition) on September 22, 1934, five years after his wife died. His funeral at the Blessed Sacrament Church of Ottawa was attended by many of the Ottawa hockey club players he had coached. He was buried in the Prescott Catholic cemetery where his wife was already interred. They had no children.

NHL coaching record

References

Bibliography

Notes

1868 births
1934 deaths
Canadian ice hockey coaches
Ottawa Senators coaches
Ice hockey people from Montreal
Stanley Cup champions
Ottawa Senators (original) personnel